"Drowning" (also known as "Drowning (Water)" or simply "Water") is a song by American rapper A Boogie wit da Hoodie featuring fellow American rapper Kodak Black, released on March 10, 2017, by Highbridge and Atlantic Records as the lead single from A Boogie's debut studio album, The Bigger Artist (2017) Written alongside producers Jahaan Sweet and Quasi, it peaked at number 38 on the Billboard Hot 100.

Commercial performance
Drowning debuted at number 94 on the US Billboard Hot 100 on the week of April 22, 2017 and has peaked at number 38 on the chart. The song spent 21 weeks on the charts before it dropped out on the week of September 16, 2017. It was A Boogie's highest-charting single and first top 40 single and Kodak Black's second Top 40 single. On July 27, 2017, the single was certified platinum by the Recording Industry Association of America (RIAA) for combined sales and streaming equivalent units of over a million units in the United States. As of July 2022, Drowning is certified 7× Platinum by RIAA.

Music video
The song's accompanying music video premiered on October 4, 2017, on A Boogie's YouTube account. The music video currently has 77 million views as of November 2022, while the audio video has 182 million views.

In the start of the video, a muffled audio clip of a news report is heard as the melodic piano arrangement of the song begins. A grand piano and a chain that reads "A Boogie" floats in the ocean before the rapper appears onscreen to deliver the chorus. He sings underwater as all his possessions, from his watch to stacks of money swim around him. Boogie is later accompanied underwater by two mermaids before footage of the actual heist gets spliced in the middle of the visual. Kodak Black's verse is replaced by a clip of A Boogie and his counterpart preparing for their robbery. As the robbery takes place, A Boogie's song "If I Gotta Go" plays in the background. The clip cuts to footage of the high-speed chase and then returns to A Boogie wit da Hoodie's underwater performance.

Sequel
On December 6, 2022, A Boogie and Kodak would release "Water (Drowning Pt. 2)" on A Boogie's fourth studio album, Me vs. Myself. It was released on A Boogie's 27th birthday.

Charts

Weekly charts

Year-end charts

Certifications

References

2017 singles
2017 songs
A Boogie wit da Hoodie songs
Songs written by A Boogie wit da Hoodie
Kodak Black songs
Songs written by Kodak Black
Atlantic Records singles